The Russian National Movie Award "Georges" is an annual award presented to recognize excellence of professionals in the film industry, directors, actors, and writers. The award was established by LiveJournal bloggers Alexander Folin, Maxim Alexandrov and Olga Belik in 2005. Historically given during the first quarter of the new year, the awards honor achievements for cinematic accomplishments for the preceding year. Winners of the award are voted by the public.

The name of the award comes from French film director Georges Méliès. The various category winners are awarded a copy of a statuette. The awarding statuette was created by artist Natalia Petrova and represents a matryoshka, which is considered a direct symbol of Russia and folk art.

Categories
The Georges Award consists of fifteen merit awards for films and television series from the previous year, as well as honorary awards for lifetime achievement.

National categories
Best Feature Film – Action
Best Feature Film – Comedy
Best Feature Film – Drama 
Best Animated Feature Film
Best Actor
Best Actress
Outstanding Comedy Series
Outstanding Drama Series

International categories
Best Foreign Film – Action
Best Foreign Film – Comedy
Best Foreign Film – Drama 
Best Actor – International
Best Actress – International
Outstanding Comedy Series – International
Outstanding Drama Series – International
Georges Special Prize

References

External links

Russian film awards
Awards established in 2005
2005 establishments in Russia